Allan Jaffee (born Abraham Jaffee; March 13, 1921) is an American cartoonist. He is notable for his work in the satirical magazine Mad, including his trademark feature, the Mad Fold-in. Jaffee was a regular contributor to the magazine for 65 years and is its longest-running contributor. In a 2010 interview, Jaffee said, "Serious people my age are dead."

With a career running from 1942 until 2020, Jaffee holds the Guinness World Record for having the longest-ever career as a comic artist.
In the half-century between April 1964 and April 2013, only one issue of Mad was published without containing new material by Jaffee.

In 2008, Jaffee was honored by the Reuben Awards as the Cartoonist of the Year. New Yorker cartoonist Arnold Roth said, "Al Jaffee is one of the great cartoonists of our time." Describing Jaffee, Peanuts creator Charles M. Schulz wrote, "Al can cartoon anything".

Early life
Jaffee was born March 13, 1921, in Savannah, Georgia, to Mildred and Morris Jaffee, the oldest of four children, all sons. His parents were Jewish immigrants from Zarasai, Lithuania.  His father had a management job at a department store in Savannah. In 1927, Mildred took her four sons, with Morris's consent, back to Zarasai.  After a year, Morris took the family back to the United States.  After another year, Mildred took the children back to Lithuania.  After four more years, Morris took the eldest three sons back to America, where they lived in Far Rockaway, Queens. The youngest son returned to America in 1940. Mildred presumably perished after the Nazi invasion. Jaffee studied at the High School of Music & Art in New York City in the late 1930s, along with his brother Harry and future Mad personnel Will Elder, Harvey Kurtzman, John Severin and Al Feldstein.

Career
Jaffee began his career in 1942, working as a comic-book artist for several publications, including Joker Comics, in which he was first published in December 1942, and continuing in other comics published by Timely Comics and Atlas Comics, the 1940s and 1950s precursors, respectively, of Marvel Comics. While working alongside future Mad cartoonist Dave Berg, Jaffee created several humor features for Timely, including "Inferior Man" and "Ziggy Pig and Silly Seal".

Jaffee originally considered himself strictly as an artist until he was disabused of the notion by editors and art directors who were reviewing his portfolio. "When prospective clients laughed and asked 'Who wrote the gag?' my response was 'I did, sir.' Which was very confusing since I didn't realize any writing had taken place. I mean, writers used typewriters, smoked pipes, wore scarves, right? When enough of them said, 'Oh, then you're a writer too,' I took their word for it. Who was I to argue with prospective employers?"

During the war, he worked as an artist for the military in various capabilities.  His work included the original floor plan for the Rusk Institute of Rehabilitation Medicine.  During this time, he took advantage of the military's free name change service, first to "Alvin Jaffe" by mistake, then to "Allan Jaffee".  While working at the Pentagon, he met Ruth Ahlquist, whom he married in 1945.

In 1946, Jaffee returned to civilian life, working for Stan Lee again.  For approximately a year and a half in the late 1940s, Jaffee was editing Timely's humor and teenage comics, including the Patsy Walker line.

Jaffee recalled in a 2004 interview,
I created Ziggy Pig and Silly Seal from scratch. [editor-in-chief] Stan [Lee] said to me, "Create an animated-type character. Something different, something new." I searched around and thought, "I've never seen anyone do anything about a seal," so I made him the lead character. So I created "Silly Seal". One day, Stan said to me, "Why don't you give him a little friend of some sort?" I had already created Ziggy Pig, who had his own little feature, so it was quite easy to combine them into one series. I said, "How about Ziggy Pig?" Stan said, "Okay!" I should add that, while I created Ziggy Pig, it was Stan who named him.

From 1957 to 1963, Jaffee drew the elongated Tall Tales panel for the New York Herald Tribune, which was syndicated to over 100 newspapers.  Jaffee credited its middling success with a pantomime format that was easy to sell abroad, but his higher-ups were unsatisfied with the strip's status:  "The head of the syndicate, who was a certifiable idiot, said the reason it was not selling [better] is we gotta put words in it.  So they made me put words in it.  Immediately lost 28 foreign papers." A collection of Jaffee's Tall Tales strips was published in 2008.   Jaffee also scripted the short-lived strips Debbie Deere and Jason in the late 1960s and early 1970s. Since 1984, Jaffee has provided illustrations for "The Shpy," a lighthearted Jewish-themed adventure feature in Tzivos Hashem's bimonthly children's publication The Moshiach Times.

Mad

Jaffee first appeared in Mad in 1955, one issue after its transformation from comic book format to magazine.  When editor Harvey Kurtzman left in a dispute three issues later, Jaffee went with Kurtzman.  Jaffee contributed to Kurtzman's first two post-Mad publishing efforts, Trump and the creator-owned Humbug. In 2008, the first full reprint of Humbug was published as a two-volume set by Fantagraphics; the set includes a newly commissioned cover illustration by Jaffee, and a co-interview with Jaffee and Arnold Roth.

After Humbug folded in 1958, Jaffee brought his unpublished material to Mad, which bought the work. "Bill Gaines took out every Trump and Humbug," remembered Jaffee, "called me into his office, sat me down on the couch next to him, and went over every issue and said "Which is yours?"  And as he came to each one, when he saw my stuff, he OK'd to hire me."

The Fold-In
In issue #86 of 1964, Jaffee created his longest-running Mad feature, the Fold-In. In each, a drawing is folded vertically and inward to reveal a new "hidden" picture (as well as a new caption).  Originally, Jaffee intended it as a one-shot "cheap" satire of the triple fold-outs that were appearing in glossy magazines such as Playboy, National Geographic and Life.  But Jaffee was asked to do a second installment, and soon the Fold-In became a recurring feature on the inside back cover of the magazine. In 2011, Jaffee reflected, "The thing that I got a kick out of was ... Jeopardy! showed a Fold-In and the contestants all came up with the word they were looking for, which was "Fold-In."  So I realized, I created an English language word."

In 2010, Jaffee described the earliest Fold-Ins:

The Fold-In became one of Mads signature features, and appeared in almost every issue of the magazine from 1964–2020. A single issue in 1977 was published without a Fold-In (though Jaffee supplied the issue's back cover), and a 1980 issue instead featured a unique double-visual gimmick by Jaffee in which the inside back cover and the outside back cover merged to create a third image when held up to the light.  The third-ever Fold-In in 1964 featured a unique diagonal folding design, rather than the standard left-right vertical format.  The image revealed the four members of The Beatles becoming bald (and thus losing their popularity).

In a Mad-like wrinkle, there are two answers to the question "When was Jaffee's last Fold-in?" The final one he designed appeared in the June 2019 issue. But his last Fold-in to be published, a personal farewell to readers, appeared in the August 2020 issue. Jaffee had prepared it six years in advance, to be published after his own death. Instead, it ran after he officially announced his retirement at the age of 99, as the conclusion of an "All Jaffee" tribute issue. Cartoonist Johnny Sampson is currently carrying the feature on.

The Far Side creator Gary Larson described his experience with the Fold-In:  "The dilemma was always this: Very slowly and carefully fold the back cover ... without creasing the page and quickly look at the joke.  Jaffee's artistry before the folding was so amazing that I suspect I was not alone in not wanting to deface it in any way." In 1972, Jaffee received a Special Features Reuben Award for his Fold-Ins.

Jaffee uses a computer only for typographic maneuvers to make certain Fold-In tricks easier to design and he typically takes two weeks to sketch and finalize an image. Otherwise, all his work is done by hand. "I'm working on a hard, flat board...  I cannot fold it. That's why my planning has to be so correct." In 2008, Jaffee told one newspaper, "I never see the finished painting folded until it's printed in the magazine. I guess I have that kind of visual mind where I can see the two sides without actually putting them together." Contrasting current art techniques and Jaffee's approach, Mad'''s art director, Sam Viviano, said, "I think part of the brilliance of the Fold-In is lost on the younger generations who are so used to Photoshop and being able to do stuff like that on a computer."

21st century
Until 2019, Jaffee continued to do the Fold-In for Mad, as well as additional artwork for articles. His last original Fold-In appeared in the June 2019 issue, which was one that had originally been rejected from the June 2013 issue due to sensitivity about gun violence. Since August 2019, Mad has been either reprinting old Fold-Ins or publishing new ones by Johnny Sampson. In December 2019, Al's original work was featured in the magazine for the last time. Mads oldest regular contributor, Jaffee's work appeared in 500 of the magazine's first 550 issues, a total unmatched by any other writer or artist. He has said, "I work for a magazine that's essentially for young people, and to have them keep me going, I feel very lucky ... To use an old cliché, I'm like an old racehorse. When the other horses are running, I want to run too." He is the longest tenured contributor to the Mad magazine.

In August 2008, Jaffee was interviewed for an NY1 feature about his career. He said, "It astonishes me that I still am functioning at a fairly decent level. Because there were a lot of dark days, but you have to reinvent yourself. You get knocked down and you pick up yourself and you move on."

A four-volume hardcover boxed set, The Mad Fold-In Collection: 1964–2010, was published by Chronicle Books in September 2011, .

Jaffee announced in June 2020 that he would be retiring. To honor this, Mad published a tribute issue that month.

Frequent themes

Will Forbis wrote: "This is the core of Jaffee's work: the idea that to be alive is to be constantly beleaguered by annoying idiots, poorly designed products and the unapologetic ferocity of fate. Competence and intelligence are not rewarded in life but punished."  In the book Inside Mad, fellow Mad writer Desmond Devlin called Jaffee "the irreplaceable embodiment of Mad Magazines range: smart but silly, angry but understanding, sophisticated but gross, upbeat but hopeless.  ...He's uncommonly interested in figuring out how things work, and exasperated because things NEVER work."

Jaffee has contributed to hundreds of Mad articles as either a writer or an artist and often both. These include his long-running "Snappy Answers to Stupid Questions", which present multiple putdowns for the same unnecessary or clueless inquiry, and several articles on inventions and gadgets, which are presented in an elaborately detailed "blueprint" style. Sergio Aragones says of Jaffee, "He is brilliant at many things, but especially inventions.  When he draws a machine for Mad, no matter how silly the idea, it always looks like it works.  He thinks that way because he is not only an artist, but a technician as well... He is the guy who can do anything." In a patent file for a self-extinguishing cigarette, the inventor thanked Jaffee for providing the inspiration. Other actual inventions that have since come to pass had appeared earlier in Jaffee articles, such as telephone redial and address books (1961), snowboarding (1965), the computer spell-checker (1967), peelable stamps, multi-blade razors (1979), and graffiti-proof building surfaces (1982).  "I could imagine those things," Jaffee told an interviewer.  "That was the fun part.  But I never had the problem of trying to figure out how to manufacture them."

During the Vietnam War, Jaffee also created the short-lived gag cartoon Hawks and Doves, in which a military officer named Major Hawks is antagonized by Private Doves, an easygoing soldier who contrives to create surreptitious peace signs in various locations on a military base. In a 1998 issue, all the Hawks & Doves strips were republished, along with an original strip in color on the back of the issue.

Some of Jaffee's features were expanded into stand-alone books, including a 1997 collection of Fold-Ins titled Fold This Book!  and eight "Snappy Answers" paperbacks. Referring to the latter, Jaffee said, "I was going through a divorce when I started that. I got a lot of my hostility out through Snappy Answers."

Techniques and materials
When designing his Mad Fold-Ins, Jaffee starts with the finished "answer" to the Fold-In, and then spreads it apart and places a piece of tracing paper over it in order to fill in the center "throw-away" aspect of the image, which is covered up when the page is folded over, using regular pencil at this stage. Jaffee will then trace the image onto another piece of illustration board using carbon paper. At this stage he uses red or green color pencils, which are distinct from the black pencil of the original drawing, in order to discern his progress. Once the image is on the illustration board, he will then finish it by painting it. Because the illustration board is too inflexible to fold, Jaffee does not see the finished Fold-In image until it is published.

Awards and recognition

Jaffee won the National Cartoonists Society Advertising and Illustration Award for 1973, its Special Features Award for 1971 and 1975, and its Humor Comic Book Award for 1979. In 2008, he won the Reuben Awards' Cartoonist of the Year.

In 2005, the production company Motion Theory created a video for recording artist Beck's song "Girl" using Jaffee's Mad Fold-Ins as inspiration; Jaffee's name appears briefly in the video, on a television screen.

The March 13, 2006, episode of The Colbert Report aired on Jaffee's 85th birthday, and comedian Stephen Colbert saluted the artist with a Fold-In birthday cake. The cake featured the salutary message "Al, you have repeatedly shown artistry & care of great credit to your field." When the center section of the cake was removed, the remainder read, "Al, you are old."

 AL, |                          |
  YOU|  HAVE  REPEATEDLY SHOWN  |
    A|RTISTRY        &        CA|RE
    O|F GREAT CREDIT TO YOUR FIE|LD

That was not Jaffee's first interaction with the comedian. In 2010, he recalled:

In October 2011 Jaffee was presented with the Sergio Award at a banquet in his honor from the Comic Art Professional Society.

In July 2013, during the San Diego Comic-Con, Jaffee was one of six inductees into the Will Eisner Hall of Fame. Jaffee, who worked for Eisner in his studio for one of his earliest jobs, was not present during the convention, and the award was accepted by Mad Art Director Sam Viviano, who presented it to Jaffee at a later date. The other inductees were Lee Falk, Mort Meskin, Spain Rodriguez, Joe Sinnott, and Trina Robbins."Al Jaffee Inducted into the Will Eisner Hall of Fame". Mad. September 11, 2013. In April 2014, Jaffee was elected to the Society of Illustrators' Hall of Fame.

In October 2013, Columbia University announced that Jaffee had donated most of his archives to the college.

On March 30, 2016, it was officially declared that Jaffee had "the longest career as a comics artist" at "73 years, 3 months" by Guinness World Records. Guinness noted that he had worked continuously, beginning with Jaffee's contribution to the December 1942 issue of Joker Comics and continuing through the April 2016 issue of Mad Magazine.

Personal life
Jaffee married Ruth Ahlquist in 1945; they had two children, Richard and Debbie. They divorced in 1967.  After the divorce, Gaines provided Jaffee with studio space at the Mad offices.

His oldest younger brother Harry Jaffee (1922–1985), who also had artistic talent, had long been coping with various illnesses—for a time he had been committed to Bellevue. Harry had been living with the Jaffees at the time.  After the divorce, Jaffee took two apartments in Manhattan, one for him, and one nearby for Harry. Jaffee also hired him from 1970 to 1977 to do his background detail and lettering. Harry quit upon Jaffee's remarriage.

In 1977, Jaffee married Joyce Revenson, a widow. They lived in Manhattan, summered in Provincetown, Massachusetts, and wintered in Puerto Vallarta, Mexico. Joyce died in January 2020.

In books
Mary-Lou Weisman, a friend of Jaffee for more than three decades, wrote a profile of him for Provincetown Arts, which she later expanded into the biography, Al Jaffee's Mad Life, published in 2010 by It Books, an imprint of HarperCollins, . In addition to reprints of his past work, Jaffee joined Weisman in telling his life story with more than 70 color illustrations depicting his childhood and later years.

See also
 List of cartoonists
 List of illustrators

References
General references
 

Inline citations

External links

 "Mad Magazine Contributors". Doug Gilford's Mad Cover Site.
 "Al Jaffee Wins the Reuben Award!" . National Cartoonists Society. May 25, 2008.
 Heater, Brian (March 3, 2009). "Interview: Al Jaffee Pt. 1 (of 3)". The Daily Cross Hatch.
 Heater, Brian (March 9, 2009). "Interview: Al Jaffee Pt. 2 (of 3)". The Daily Cross Hatch.
 Heater, Brian (March 16, 2009). "Interview: Al Jaffee Pt. 3 (of 3)". The Daily Cross Hatch.
 "Fold-Ins, Past and Present". The New York Times''. October 1, 2010.
 Kloeffler, Dan; Abraham, Mary-Rose (February 14, 2014). "Cartoonist Al Jaffee Reveals the One Fold-In 'MAD Magazine' Wouldn’t Run". Yahoo! News.
 "Al Jaffee Papers, 1945-2018". Columbia University Libraries. Rare Book & Manuscript Library.
 
 

1921 births
American centenarians
Men centenarians
Mad (magazine) cartoonists
People from Far Rockaway, Queens
People from Savannah, Georgia
American satirists
American people of Lithuanian-Jewish descent
Living people
People from Manhattan
Harvey Award winners for Best Cartoonist
People from Provincetown, Massachusetts
Reuben Award winners
Jewish American artists
American military personnel of World War II
The High School of Music & Art alumni
Comedians from New York City
Comedians from Georgia (U.S. state)
Comedians from Massachusetts
Mad (magazine) people
Guinness World Records